Nowa Dąbrowa may refer to the following places:
Nowa Dąbrowa, Międzychód County in Greater Poland Voivodeship (west-central Poland)
Nowa Dąbrowa, Nowy Tomyśl County in Greater Poland Voivodeship (west-central Poland)
Nowa Dąbrowa, Masovian Voivodeship (east-central Poland)
Nowa Dąbrowa, Wolsztyn County in Greater Poland Voivodeship (west-central Poland)
Nowa Dąbrowa, Pomeranian Voivodeship (north Poland)
Nowa Dąbrowa, West Pomeranian Voivodeship (north-west Poland)